Kevin Ricki Larsen (born July 17, 1993) is a Danish basketball player for Movistar Estudiantes of the LEB Oro. Standing at 2.08 m (6 ft 10 in), he either plays as power forward or center. Larsen played college basketball for the George Washington Colonials.

Professional career
On August 6, 2016, Larsen signed his first contract with French side Lille Métropole. In January 2017, he signed with ProA side Mitteldeutscher BC. With Mitteldeutscher, he won the championship and gained promotion to the Basketball Bundesliga (BBL), the German first tier.

For the 2017–18 season, he returned to his home country to sign with Horsens IC. After the season, he was named the Basketligaen MVP. He averaged 19.2 points, 7.2 rebounds and 3.2 assists per game.

On August 7, 2018, Larsen signed with RETAbet Bilbao Basket of the LEB Oro. On July 12, 2019, Larsen signed with Chocolates Trapa Palencia of the LEB Oro. He averaged 14.2 points, 6.3 rebounds and 2.1 assists per game and was voted to Eurobasket.com All-Spanish LEB Gold 2nd Team. On July 15, 2020, Larsen signed with Breogán. On December 27, 2021, he signed with Movistar Estudiantes.

References

External links
George Washington Colonials bio

1993 births
Living people
Bilbao Basket players
CB Breogán players
Centers (basketball)
Danish expatriate basketball people in Spain
Danish expatriate basketball people in the United States
Danish expatriate basketball people in France
Danish men's basketball players
Danish expatriate basketball people in Germany
George Washington Colonials men's basketball players
Horsens IC players
Liga ACB players
Lille Métropole BC players
Mitteldeutscher BC players
Palencia Baloncesto players
Sportspeople from Copenhagen